Orla Joan Gartland (born 3 February 1995) is an Irish singer-songwriter and guitarist from Dublin who gained popularity from posting cover songs on her YouTube account. As of February 2023, her YouTube channel has received over 286,000 subscribers and 24.3 million total views.

Gartland describes her music as folk pop, most heavily influenced by Joni Mitchell, Regina Spektor, and Imogen Heap. She frequently refers to herself as a "music makin' ginger nutcase".

In August 2011 Gartland released her first EP Laughing at My Own Jokes. The album artwork was done by a fan who won a contest. In 2012, she released her debut single, "Devil on My Shoulder", which entered the singer-songwriter iTunes charts in Ireland. On 11 November 2013, Gartland released her second EP, Roots. On 24 November, the Irish Mirror featured Gartland in a full-page article and stated that on iTunes, the EP had topped the main Irish albums chart while hitting number 15 on the main UK albums chart and number two on the US singer-songwriter albums chart.

Gartland's third EP, Lonely People, was released on 18 January 2015, while her fourth EP, Why Am I Like This?, was released on 24 May 2019. Her fifth EP, Freckle Season, was released on 21 February 2020 and features previous singles "Did It to Myself", "Figure It Out", and "Heavy". Her debut album, Woman on the Internet, was released on 20 August 2021.

Life and career 
In an interview by Campus.ie, Gartland is quoted "I played violin, fiddle, and trad and Irish stuff from the age of about five years old...my parents got me into lessons and the guitar at about 12 years old and it went from there." She posted her first YouTube video at age 13 about which she stated "I had been playing guitar for just over a year and wailing alongside the chords. I hadn't a clue how to sing; the breathing or any of the technical stuff (still haven't the foggiest) – so just wanted some feedback on that really!".
In June 2021, Gartland publicly came out as bisexual on Twitter.

2009–2013: Early music 
In 2009, Gartland launched her YouTube channel under the name "MusicMaaad." She posted covers and then started posting originals. The first original she posted was titled "Green Eyed Monster."

In 2011, Broken Wall Films made a video of Gartland's song "All The Little Details."  The video was shot in a coffee shop which remained open for business during the filming. "All The Little Details" was Gartland's first professionally recorded song. It was included along with two other songs on her "Laughing At My Own Jokes" EP.

In 2012, Gartland opened for Britain's Got Talent contestant Ryan O'Shaughnessy at The Academy and for Scottish singer-songwriter Nina Nesbitt at Bewley's Cafe Theatre. She released her debut single "Devil on my Shoulder" on 17 June on iTunes, where it reached No. 2 on the Ireland singer-songwriter chart. The single was launched at a sold-out show headlined by Gartland at The Academy in Dublin.

In March 2013 Gartland announced her first tour, headlining five shows in the UK and in Ireland during July 2013.

2013–2015: Roots and Lonely People 
On 11 November 2013 Gartland released her four-song EP Roots on iTunes. The titular track "Roots" was named Apple iTunes "Single of the Week" in the UK and Ireland. She toured in support of the album in February 2014 visiting ten cities in Ireland and in the United Kingdom.

Gartland contributed the song "Cast Your Stone" on the album Simple Things, a compilation album released on 15 November 2013 by Niall Breslin in support of suicide prevention in Ireland. She participated in a group performance of "Simple Things" musicians on RTÉ programme, The Saturday Night Show.

The Irish Daily Star selected Gartland as one of "20 music acts to watch in 2014." The Irish Independent selected Gartland as one of "Ireland's most influential teens." GoldenPlec selected Gartland as their "Plec Pick" of 2014, chosen as one of the best solo artists in Ireland.

Gartland, along with Greta Isaac, performed the song "Have Yourself A Merry Little Christmas" which they contributed to the compilation album It's Coming on Christmas. The album raised funds for the breast cancer charity, CoppaFeel!. Gartland has played alongside Dodie Clark in all three of her EP release tours, and acted as a supporting act in Clark's 2019 'Human' tour.

Gartland's second EP, Lonely People, debuted in 2015 and was described by Atwood Magazine as an "undeniable triumph" that "captivates" by combining funk and alt-pop.

2018–2020: Why Am I Like This? and Freckle Season 
On 2 May 2018, Gartland released her first single in three years, "I Go Crazy", and on 2 November 2018 she released a new single "Between My Teeth", which she announced were both standalone singles. On 8 February 2019, she released a new single "Why Am I Like This?", followed by "Flatline" on 5 April 2019, both of which formed a part of her EP Why Am I Like This?, released on 24 May 2019.

On 6 September 2019, Gartland released the single "Did It to Myself", followed by "Figure It Out" on 1 November 2019, and "Heavy" on 15 January 2020, all of which appear on her EP Freckle Season. "Figure It Out" is described as being about a relationship between individuals where neither can escape from it and the idea of needing space from someone you still care about. "Heavy" featured in the BBC Three trailer for the 2020 adaptation of Normal People, with "Did It To Myself" featuring directly in the tv series. She was also a co-writer of K-pop boy band BTS's song "134340" from the album Love Yourself: Tear.

In 2020, Gartland was part of an Irish collective of female singers and musicians called "Irish Women in Harmony", that recorded a version of the song "Dreams" in aid of the charity Safe Ireland, which deals with domestic abuse which had reportedly risen significantly during the COVID-19 lockdown.

Gartland also released her fourth and fifth EPs, Why Am I Like This? and Freckle Season respectively, as a vinyl in 2020 titled Why Is Freckle Season Like This?. The vinyl included the tracklist of both EPs in addition to a currently unreleased song, "Don’t Fall In Love With A Musician" and an acoustic version of "Figure It Out".

2020–present: Woman on the Internet 
On 16 October 2020, Gartland released a single called "Pretending". The song discusses the difficulty and trouble of pretending to be the person someone else wants, in order to be a "people pleaser". This is to be the first single released from Woman on the Internet, her debut album released on 20 August 2021. The second single, "More Like You", was released on 13 January 2021. According to Gartland herself, the song deals with identity, jealousy, and the desire to have the life of someone who seems to have everything easy. The third single, "Zombie!", was released on 13 April 2021. It deals with the topic of toxic masculinity and with Gartland entreating another individual to open up about their emotions and stop repressing their true feelings. The song was produced alongside Pete Robertson, a producer for beabadoobee and The Vaccines.

Discography

Studio albums

EPs

Singles

Music videos

Awards and nominations

Choice Music Prize 

|-
| 2022 || Woman on the Internet || Irish Album of the Year 2021 || Nominated
|-

References

External links
 Official website
 Orla Gartland on Youtube

Living people
1995 births
21st-century Irish women singers
Irish women singer-songwriters
Musicians from Dublin (city)
People from Drumcondra, Dublin
Bisexual women
Bisexual singers
Bisexual songwriters
Irish bisexual people
Irish LGBT singers
Irish LGBT songwriters
20th-century Irish LGBT people
21st-century Irish LGBT people